Bathing Festival may refer to:

Hindu culture
Kumbh Melas
Haridwar Kumbh Mela
Allahabad Kumbh Mela
Ujjain Simhastha
Nashik-Trimbakeshwar Simhastha
Makar Sankranti
Pushkaram
Snana Yatra

Others
Tibetan Golden Star Festival
Nepali Maghe Sankranti
Melaka Malay Mandi Safar

See also
Bath Festival (disambiguation)
Water Festival